The 1964 Washington State Cougars football team was an American football team that represented Washington State University in the Athletic Association of Western Universities (AAWU) during the 1964 NCAA University Division football season. In their first season under head coach Bert Clark, the Cougars compiled a 3–6–1 record (1–2–1 in AAWU, tie for sixth), and were outscored 208 to 165.

The team's statistical leaders included Dave Petersen with 478 passing yards, Clancy Williams with 783 rushing yards, and Tom Kelley with 218 receiving yards. Williams was the ninth overall pick of the 1965 NFL Draft, selected in the first round by the Los Angeles Rams.

Hired in January, Clark was previously an assistant at rival Washington for seven seasons under head coach Jim Owens; both had played collegiately at Oklahoma under hall of fame head coach Bud Wilkinson. Clark's initial contract at WSU was for three years at $16,500 per year.

Schedule

Roster

Game summaries

Stanford

NFL Draft
Two Cougars were selected in the 1965 NFL Draft.

References

External links
 Game program: Stanford vs. WSU at Spokane – September 19, 1964
 Game program: Wyoming at WSU – September 26, 1964
 Game program: Pacific at WSU – October 10, 1964
 Game program: Oregon State at WSU – October 31, 1964
 Game program: Washington vs. WSU at Spokane – November 21, 1964

Washington State
Washington State Cougars football seasons
Washington State Cougars football